The Old Wanchai Market Building was constructed in 1937. It is located at 264 Queen's Road East, at the Wan Chai Road crossing, opposite Stone Nullah Lane in Wan Chai, Hong Kong Island. It is a Grade III Historic Building.

Its architectural style is influenced by Streamline Moderne (also known as Streamlined Moderne or Art Moderne) architecture, a popular style of building of the 1930s. It is often erroneously referred to as a Bauhaus-style building.

Wan Chai Market, the wet market housed in the old market building since 1937, has moved into the new market complex on the lower levels of "The Zenith", a newly built residential development located just opposite to the market building, in September 2008.

The Wan Chai Market was initially a wet place where merchants would sell their belongings. It was also used as a garage for Bullock Carts and thus was called the 'Wet Garage'. It was named in 1917.

History
During Japanese occupation, the basement of the Wan Chai Market was used by Japanese soldiers for the storage of corpses.

In 1961, the Market underwent a renovation to improve its facilities and environment so that the Market could compete with other market places in the district.

The Land Development Corporation obtained approval from the Executive Council to acquire land in Wan Chai, including this site, for redevelopment as part of an urban renewal project. A consortium was formed comprising Chinese Estates (40%), Kwong Sang Hong (25%), Chi Cheung Investment (20%) and Peregrine Group (15%).

Chinese Estates, controlled by Joseph Lau Luen-hung, agreed with the Urban Renewal Authority in 1996 to jointly redevelop the site into a luxury residential-commercial complex. Phase two of the project, which requires the demolition of the building, was scheduled to start early 2008 and be completed by mid-2011.

In 2007, the Urban Renewal Authority and the Development Bureau jointly announced that the facade and the front part of the historic market building will be preserved in the redevelopment project; the front part will be used as a
shopping centre. A residential building will stand at the back of the market building.

Facilities
There is a basement and staff quarters in the building.

In popular culture
In the successful video game by Eidos, Deus Ex, Wan Chai Market is used as the basis for a portion of the game.

Gallery

See also
Wan Chai Heritage Trail
Central Market, Hong Kong

References

Retail markets in Hong Kong
Queen's Road East
Wan Chai
Grade III historic buildings in Hong Kong
British colonial architecture
Streamline Moderne architecture